The Men's relay event of the Biathlon World Championships 2013 was held on February 16, 2013. 29 nations participated over a course of 4 × 7.5 km.

Results
The race was started at 15:15.

References

Men's relay